"Stop It" is a single of the Anarchic System, released in 1976. This single was an attempt of the production to maintain the success of the album Generation.

Track listing 

A Side :
"Stop It" (P. de Senneville, O. Toussaint) — 3:12

B Side :
"A Journey in Tobago" (P. de Senneville, O. Toussaint) — 2:10

Distribution 
for France : Delphine Records index catalog 64020, Distribution Discodis

Anarchic System songs
1976 singles
Songs written by Olivier Toussaint
Songs with music by Paul de Senneville